Carey Morris (17 May 1882 – 17 November 1968) was a Welsh painter, illustrator, author and businessman born in Llandeilo, Carmarthenshire.

He was related to the Welsh poet Sir Lewis Morris.

Personal life 
Carey Morris was the son of Benjamin and Elizabeth Boynes Morris who ran a house painter and decorator's business in Llandeilo. The family lived in a house on Prospect Place, which now forms part of Rhosmaen Street.

He married Jessie Phillips, who was the author of children's books, which he illustrated, and a journalist.

Education 
Morris attended the National School and Llandeilo County School. Then he began his artistic studies at the Forbes School of Painting from 1902 to 1907. Two years after completing his studies at Forbes he began his studies at the Slade School of Art. At Slade, Professor Henry Tonks was a physician who imparted the knowledge of anatomy that created a three-dimensional quality to Morris' work. It was said of Honk that: He also studied at the Newlyn School in Cornwall, where he included Cornish people, such as Saunders the Postman, and took advantage of the Cornish landscape and light when creating his works.

Career and war years
After completing his studies in Newlyn, he returned to London and maintained a studio on Cheyne Walk, Chelsea. Two members of the Edwards family from his hometown were featured in 1910 in The Welsh Weavers, which was published in the United States and the United Kingdom. His friends and acquaintances included William Orpen, John Nash, Ethelbert White, Elizabeth and Stanhope Forbes, Frank Brangwyn, Evan Walters, Sir George Clausen and Sir Herbert Herkomer.

During the First World War, he enlisted in the South Wales Borderers. He was on the Isle of Wight serving with the Isle of Wight Rifles from 1915 to 1917 and found some time during the war to paint. In the trenches of Flanders he suffered from poison gas which left him with lifelong health issues. He spent twelve months in hospitals in the Isle of Wight and Liverpool.

After the war Morris had a studio in Chelsea and the couple lived in London. Although Morris concentrated primarily on portraits, he also worked as an illustrator for his wife and other authors.

During the 1920s, Morris was a director of the National Eisteddfod and was acquainted with members of the Welsh squirearchy, including Sir Joseph Bradney. In Llandeilo he worked for the family business.

Works
 Boesinghe Chateau, Yser Canal, January 1917
 Cefn Bryn, Gower, from Kilvrough
 Harbour Scene
 Landscape in Carmarthenshire
 Quayside
 Ships
 The Last Farm in England, exhibited at the Royal Academy
 The Welsh Weavers, about 1910
 Three Cliffs Bay Gower, Morning
 Woman
 Woman at the Well

Portraits
 Colonel Delmé William Campbell Davies-Evans (1873–1953)
 Eirwen Jones
 John Johnes of Dolaucothi (1884–1902)
 Miss Mary Eirwen Jones (1911–1996)
 Mrs Mary J. Jones
 Rutland Boughton (1878–1960)
 Sir Joseph Bradney (1859–1933)
 Sir Lewis Morris (1833–1907)
 Sir Vincent Evans (1851–1934)

Exhibitions
His work was exhibited at:
 Birmingham
 Glasgow Institute of Fine Arts
 Liverpool
 London Salon
 Royal Academy
 Royal Society of Portrait Painters

Publications 
His publications included:
 Personality as a Force in Art 
 Art and Religion in Wales 
 Craftsmanship Should Not Be Allowed to Die

References 

1882 births
1968 deaths
20th-century Welsh painters
20th-century Welsh male artists
20th-century Welsh writers
Alumni of the Slade School of Fine Art
Art writers
Cornish culture
History of Carmarthenshire
Newlyn School of Artists
Painters and decorators
People from Llandeilo
South Wales Borderers soldiers
Welsh male painters
Welsh soldiers